{{Infobox settlement
|name                   = Santa Cruz de Minas
|settlement_type        = Municipality
|official_name          = Municipality ofSanta Cruz de Minas
|nickname               = "A Menorzinha do Brasil, Santa Cruz" ("Brazil's Littlest, Santa Cruz")
|motto                  = 
|image_skyline          = Santa Cruz de Minas.jpg
|imagesize              = 250px
|image_caption          = A view of a street of Santa Cruz de Minas
|image_flag             = 
|image_seal             =
|image_map              = MinasGerais Municip SantaCruzdeMinas.svg
|mapsize                = 
|map_caption            = Location of Santa Cruz de Minas in Minas Gerais and Brazil
|pushpin_map            = 
|pushpin_map_size       = 
|pushpin_map_caption    = 
|subdivision_type       = Country
|subdivision_type1      = Region
|subdivision_type2      = State
|subdivision_name       = 
|subdivision_name1      = Southeast
|subdivision_name2      =  Minas Gerais
|leader_title           = Mayor
|leader_name            = José Antônio dos Santos (PP)(2009-2012)
Sinara Rafaela Campos (PT)(2017–2020)
|established_title      = Founded
|established_date       = December 21, 1995
|area_magnitude         = 
|area_total_km2         = 2.859 
|area_land_km2          = 
|area_water_km2         = 
|area_water_percent     = 
|area_urban_km2         = 
|area_metro_km2         = 
|population_as_of       = 2020 
|population_note        = 
|population_footnotes   = 
|population_total       = 8,664
|population_urban       = 
|population_density_km2 = 2,752.71
|population_demonym     = santacruzense
|timezone               = BRT
|utc_offset             = −3
|timezone_DST           = 
|utc_offset_DST         = 
|coordinates            = 
|elevation_m            = 930
|area_code              = +55 38
|postal_code_type       = Postal Code (CEP)
|postal_code            = 
|blank_name             = ''HDI (2000)
|blank_info             = 0.755 – medium
|website                = 
|footnotes              = 
}}Santa Cruz de Minas''' is a Brazilian municipality located in the state of Minas Gerais. The city belongs to the mesoregion of Campo das Vertentes and to the microregion of Sao Joao del Rei. It is the smallest municipality of Brazil, measuring only .

Geography 
According to IBGE (2017), the municipality belongs to the Immediate Geographic Region of São João del-Rei, in the Intermediate Geographic Region of Barbacena.

Ecclesiastical circumscription 
The municipality is part of the Roman Catholic Diocese of São João del-Rei.

See also
 List of municipalities in Minas Gerais

References 

Municipalities in Minas Gerais